Cianorte Futebol Clube, more commonly referred to as Cianorte, is a Brazilian professional association football club in Cianorte, Paraná which currently plays in Campeonato Paranaense, the top division of the Paraná state football league.

History
The club was founded on February 13, 2002, replacing a defunct club named Cianorte Esporte Clube.

Cianorte was eliminated in the first stage of Campeonato Brasileiro Série C in 2005, and in the second round of 2005 Copa do Brasil.

2011 current squad

References

External links
 Cianorte Futebol Clube Official Website
 Cianorte Futebol Clube at Arquivo de Clubes

 
Association football clubs established in 2002
Football clubs in Paraná (state)
2002 establishments in Brazil